Eimhin  was the abbot and bishop of Ros-mic-Truin (Ireland), probably in the sixth century.

Eimhin came from Munster, and was brother of two other saints, Culain and Diarmuid. Of the early part of his religious life little is known.

Although the Abbey of Ros-mic-Truin was founded by St Abban, it is said to have been colonized by St Eimhin, and from the number of religious and students belonging to the south of Ireland who dwelt there the place came to be called "Ros-glas of the Munstermen". St Eimhin is said by some to have been the author of the life of St Patrick, called the Vita Tripartita (ed. Whitley Stokes in R.S.), originally published by the Franciscan John Colgan.

The date of Eimhin's death has not been recorded; however, competent authorities assign it to the earlier half of the sixth century. The town of Monasterevin in County Kildare and the village of Effin in County Limerick are named after Eimhin.

The feast-day of Saint Eimhin is observed in the Irish calendars on 22 December.

References

Christian clergy from County Wexford
6th-century Christian saints
6th-century Irish bishops
6th-century Irish abbots
Medieval Irish saints
6th-century Irish writers
6th-century Latin writers